Shishi High School is a state secondary school in Chengdu, Sichuan, China. It stands on the site of the first public school ever built, built in 143–141 BC by the Han dynasty governor Wén Wēng (文翁). It was originally constructed in stone, hence the name Shishi (石室), or stone chamber. The school is also known as Wenweng Shishi, the "Stone Chamber of Wen Weng".

History
Between the years 143 and 141 BC, Wén Wēng (文翁), the Western Han dynasty governor of Shu Commandery (modern Sichuan), established the first Chinese public school, Shujun Junxue (Shu Commandery Academy, 蜀郡郡学). The great Han dynasty scholar Sima Xiangru studied at the school.

During the Eastern Han Dynasty, the school was devastated by fire. It was rebuilt in 199 AD, and continued through China's imperial dynasties as Yizhou Zhouxue (益州州学, Yizhou Prefecture School), Chengdu Fuxue (Chengdu Prefecture Academy, 成都府学), and other names. Shu Shi Jing (a form of Thirteen Classics, literally Shu Carved Stone of Classics, 蜀石经) was completed in Chengdu Fuxue in Northern Song, after more than 230 years of intermittent carving. In the 17th century, as the Ming dynasty collapsed, Zhang Xianzhong's rebel force devastated Sichuan and the school was destroyed.

In 1661, early in the Qing Dynasty, the Chengdu Fuxue (prefecture school of Chengdu) was reestablished on the site, and became a leading school in Sichuan. Jinjiang Academy, which later became Sichuan University, was established at the school in 1740. Chengdu Fuxue became Chengdu Normal School (成都师范学堂) under the new educational system introduced in 1902. It then became Chengdu Middle School (成都府中学堂) in 1904. It was renamed again to Chengdu Shishi Middle School (成都石室中学) in February 1940, and in mid-1948 was identified as a model for secondary schools nationwide.

In September 1952, after the establishment of the People's Republic of China, the school changed its name to Chengdu No. 4 Middle School (成都第四中学).  During the Cultural Revolution, the school was devastated for the third time; none of the Qing Dynasty buildings still exist.  It returned to its former name in April 1983.

Shishi ranks among the top 100 high schools in China. Its admission is highly selective, and attracts applications each year from both local and neighboring middle schools. Most Shishi students scored among the top 10% of their peers on the junior middle school exit exam.

Notable alumni
Guo Moruo (郭沫若): scientist, sociologist, former dean of the Chinese Academy of Sciences, former vice-chairman of Standing Committee of the National People's Congress.
Li Yimang (李一氓): revolutionist, former member of the Central Advisory Commission of the Chinese Communist Party 
Wu Guozhen: former Shanghai mayor
Ma Zhiming (马志明): mathematician, academician of the Chinese Academy of Science, former vice-president of the China Mathematics Association, academician of Third World Academy of Science, former vice-president and executive of IMU
He Lin (贺麟): cell biologist, academician of the Chinese Academy of Science
Li Jieren (李劼人): litterateur, former Chengdu mayor
Li Hao (李卓皓): Professor of Economics, University of British Columbia
Jung Chang: Chinese-born British writer now living in London, best known for her family autobiography, Wild Swans
 Zhong Shan (钟山): Academician of the Chinese Academy of Engineering and the International Academy of Astronautics

References 

《石室校志》by 四川省成都石室中学,1989年10月

External links 

 The official website of Chengdu Shishi High School https://web.archive.org/web/20150626070856/http://www.cdshishi.net/its/
 A YouTube video introducing the school made by her alumni https://www.youtube.com/watch?v=5ttEWjo4AFI

Education in Chengdu
Educational institutions established in the 2nd century BC
Educational institutions established in the 1660s
140s BC establishments
2nd-century BC establishments in China
High schools in Sichuan
2nd-century establishments in China
1661 establishments in China
Han dynasty